Lawrence Gates is the former Chair of the Kansas Democratic Party. During his tenure the Democrats were able to win top offices and make gains in the Kansas Legislature by appealing to moderate Republican and independent voters.

Personal life and public service
Gates graduated from the University of Kansas and is a resident of Overland Park, Kansas. Besides his work for the Democrats, Gates has raised funds for disaster relief and serves as a Governance Boardmember for the nonprofit Community Living Opportunities, Inc. whose mission it is to mission is to help people with severe developmental disabilities achieve a fulfilling lifestyle.

Professional life
Gates founded the law firm Gates, Biles, Shields & Ryan, P.A. in 1980 and is active in the real estate business.

References

External links
 Kansas Democratic Party

Year of birth missing (living people)
Living people
People from Overland Park, Kansas
University of Kansas alumni
Kansas lawyers
Kansas Democrats
State political party chairs of Kansas